Mr. Monk Goes to the Firehouse (2006) is a mystery novel by Lee Goldberg, based on the popular TV series Monk. In the novel, Adrian Monk temporarily moves in with his assistant, Natalie Teeger, while his home is being fumigated. Following this, her teenage daughter Julie "hires" him to investigate the death of Sparky, a popular firehouse guard dog who was struck with an axe on the same night that a house inferno was occupying its owners.

This was the first published Monk novel. A plot point from the novel was reused in the TV episode "Mr. Monk Can't See a Thing".

Plot synopsis
Adrian Monk, an obsessive-compulsive private detective, moves in with his assistant Natalie Teeger while his apartment is being fumigated. Julie tells Natalie that Sparky, a firehouse dalmatian who visited her school during Fire Safety Week, was found murdered the previous night. Monk volunteers to identify the killer.

Monk and Natalie head to Sparky's firehouse in North Beach. Captain Mantooth, the commander of the engine company, says that Sparky belonged to Joe Cochran, and always slept in the firehouse while Joe was on duty. The crew was called to a house fire around 10:00pm. An old woman named Esther Stoval died, having fallen asleep while smoking a cigarette. In the four hours they were gone, someone sneaked into the firehouse and killed Sparky with a pickaxe. The only thing missing were two towels, seemingly eliminating the possibility that the killer was there to rob the firehouse.

At the scene of the previous night's fire, Monk and Natalie run into Captain Stottlemeyer, who is treating the house as a crime scene until the arson investigator makes a decision. The arson investigator concludes the death was an accident. However, Monk observes that from Stoval's position on the couch, her view of the TV was blocked by an empty chair, indicating she had a visitor. He believes Stoval was murdered.

Monk and Natalie find Joe Cochran. Natalie falls for the ruggedly handsome, big-hearted, and courteous Joe. Joe says that the only person he can think of who disliked Sparky is Gregorio Dumas, a dog breeder who lives across the street from the firehouse. Dumas threatened the fire company with a lawsuit after Sparky impregnated his prize show poodle Letitia. Dumas says he was at home on Friday night, watching the firehouse to make sure Sparky did not enter his property. He saw a lone firefighter come out. When Natalie brings this up on a date with Joe, Joe says all the on-duty firemen were at Stoval's house that night and they never sent anyone back for supplies. Monk also wonders how Sparky could have infiltrated Letitia's locked kennel surrounded by barbed wire.

The autopsy on Esther Stoval reports no smoke or soot particles in her lungs or nasal passages, confirming that Stoval was dead before the fire was started. She was apparently suffocated with a pillow. By burning down the house, the killer destroyed all forensic evidence, including usable fingerprints and DNA.

Monk and Natalie ask around the neighborhood. All of Stoval's neighbors despised her: she spied on the neighbors, reported their most minor infractions to the authorities, and kept them up all night with the mewling of her cats. She was also the lone holdout against a development plan by Lucas Breen, a local real estate tycoon, to demolish the houses on Stoval's side of the street and build an upscale condominium block.

Monk, Natalie, and Stottlemeyer interview Breen, who holds a seat on the police commission. Breen says he had no motive to kill Stoval, because he already had plans to build his condo project around her house. When Monk asks for an alibi, Breen claims he was at a fundraiser at the Excelsior Tower Hotel downtown with his wife.

Monk is convinced Breen killed Stoval, since Lizzie Draper, a neighbor across the street from Stoval, was wearing a shirt with buttons monogrammed "LB" and had a handmade bouquet identical to the ones sold in the lobby flower shop of Breen's building, suggesting that Draper is Breen's mistress. Given Stoval's spying habits, Monk speculates that Stoval had incriminating photos of Breen with Draper and was blackmailing Breen, threatening to tell his wife, and he killed her to keep her quiet. He dismisses Breen's alibi: the fundraiser was crowded enough that Breen could have slipped out, killed Stoval, set the house on fire, and returned an hour later without anyone noticing he had gone.

Visiting the firehouse, Natalie asks Joe questions about Sparky's habits. Joe says that Sparky was allowed to run loose around the neighborhood when they were out responding to 9-1-1 calls. In the last few weeks, he always returned to the firehouse smelling like feces. Realizing why, Monk confronts Dumas, accusing him of tunneling into the basement of the firehouse via the sewer line. He used Letitia to distract Sparky so he would not bark, while Dumas searched the basement, which historical records show is where a famous 19th-century train robber stashed his treasure. He used the missing towels to wipe the sewage off his shoes. Dumas swears he did not kill Sparky, and repeats that he saw a lone fireman leaving the garage. Monk believes him, and concludes that Dumas saw Breen posing as a fireman.

The only plausible explanation for Breen posing as a fireman is that he realized he had left incriminating evidence in Stoval's house. He sneaked into the firehouse, but Sparky attacked him and Breen used a pickaxe to defend himself. He stole a helmet and turnout coat, retrieved the incriminating item without any emergency workers noticing him, and returned the stolen gear to the firehouse before returning to the fundraiser.

As Monk and Natalie walk back to the hotel, Natalie is mugged by a man with a knife, but she gets the better of him. Monk asks him whether he mugged anyone in that area on the night of the fire. The mugger admits that he mugged Lucas Breen. Monk, Natalie, and Stottlemeyer confront Breen about the mugging. Breen reported his stolen credit cards to his bank, but not the police. Breen claims he was mugged while out having a cigarette.

Monk notices that in a photo of Breen at the fundraiser, Breen is wearing his overcoat, but in a photo showing him leaving at midnight, the overcoat is gone. Monk reasons that he wore it to Stoval's, because it was raining, and forgot to take it when he left. He had to get that overcoat back, because if it were like the rest of his wardrobe, it had monogrammed buttons with his initials. Monk and Natalie try to figure where the coat could have been ditched. Randy Disher calls Natalie to tell them that the mugger has confirmed that Breen was wearing his overcoat when he was mugged. Natalie finds the dumpsters on the route have been recently emptied. Joe and several off-duty firefighters pitch in to help root through the recently collected trash at the city dump, but without finding the overcoat. That night, Natalie goes on a second date with Joe, and they get even closer, though Natalie is disturbed by how nonchalantly Joe takes the dangers of his job.

A homeless man is found bludgeoned to death with a brick. Natalie and Monk recognize him. When they saw him before, he was wearing a tattered overcoat, but no longer has it despite the cold temperatures. Monk realized the overcoat must have been Breen's; the homeless man picked it out of the dumpster. Natalie, Monk, and Stottlemeyer race to Breen's house to recover the coat, but Breen has incinerated it in his fireplace.

While flipping through a book of Marmaduke cartoons, Monk realizes that Breen's recent sneezing may be an allergic reaction to cat dander which collected on Breen's overcoat during the fire. Stottlemeyer and Natalie confront Breen in his penthouse office, telling him that they are searching Breen's car and house for cat dander and plan to match it to Stoval's cats. Breen flees in a private elevator. As Breen drives out of the parking garage, Monk grabs two bowls of clam chowder from the lobby restaurant and throws them at Breen's windshield, blinding him, and causing him to crash. Breen stumbles out of his car and aims a gun at Monk. Randy arrives and shoots the gun out of his hand.

The hairs in Breen's house and car match with Stoval's cats. A commendation event is held for Randy. Monk and Natalie return to the firehouse to inform the crews that they have caught Sparky's killer. Joe wants to take Natalie out to celebrate, but Natalie says she is falling for Joe, and does not want to get involved with another man in a dangerous job after she and Julie lost Mitch. Joe is crestfallen, but accepts her decision.

Julie is so grateful to Monk for finding Sparky's killer that she organizes her bedroom just as he would like it. While Monk is preparing to move back home, he tells Stottlemeyer to arrest Mrs. Throphamner, Natalie's elderly next-door neighbor who has been babysitting Julie. He says that she murdered her husband; she has been wearing his dentures in place of her own, and constantly planting and re-planting roses to conceal his decaying corpse buried in her garden. Furious that Monk would let her leave Julie in the care of a murderer, Natalie stalks off.

Main characters

Characters from the television series
Adrian Monk, the detective
Natalie Teeger, Monk's loyal assistant and the narrator of the book
Captain Leland Stottlemeyer, Captain of the San Francisco Police Department's homicide division; Monk's former partner
Lieutenant Randy Disher, Stottlemeyer's right-hand man
Julie Teeger, Natalie's teenaged daughter

Original characters
Sparky, a murdered firehouse dog
Captain Mantooth, Fire Captain
Joseph "Joe" Cochran, a senior firefighter
Esther Stoval, a murdered woman
Gregorio Dumas, a man who has held a grudge against Sparky
Mrs. Throphamner, Natalie's next-door neighbor and babysitter for Julie
Aubrey Brudnick, Esther Stoval's next-door neighbor, and a worker at a think tank
Neal and Kate Finney, some of Esther's other neighbors
Burton Joyner, an antique car restorer who lived across the street from Esther
Lucas Breen, CEO of the Breen Development Corporation
Lizzie Draper, Breen's mistress and a stripper at a nightclub
Marlon Tolliver, a mugger
A homeless man

References

2006 American novels
Monk (novel series)
Monk (TV series) episodes
2006 American television episodes
Signet Books books